Five Times Dizzy is a children's novel by Australian author Nadia Wheatley It was first published in 1982. In 1986 it became an Australian children's television series.

Plot summary

Five Times Dizzy is about the comedy and drama of a Greek Australian family in a multi-cultural neighbourhood of inner-city Sydney. To help her Greek grandmother feel more at home, Mareka comes up with a brilliant plan to give her a pet goat.

Television adaptation
The mini-series Five Times Dizzy first screened on the Nine Network in 1986. The series  was filmed on location in the inner-city suburb of Newtown and is notable for an acting role by Mary Kostakidis, who went on to become a longtime newsreader on SBS. It was also where John Doyle and Greig Pickhaver first met, the pair going on to establish their longstanding Roy & HG partnership.

Cast
 Rebekah Elmaloglou as Mareka Nikakis
 Mary Kostakidis as Roula Nikakis
 Stavros Economidis as Georgio Nikakis
 Dominic Elmaloglou as Costa
 Helen Kambos as Yaya (Grandma)
 Jane Clifton as Mrs Wilson
 Jim Holt as Brian Brooking
 Joanne Samuel as Chris Booking
 Ray Meagher
 Joseph and Matthew Homshaw as the Gallaghers
 John Doyle
 Greig Pickhaver

Awards and nominations
New South Wales Premier's Literary Awards Special Children's Book Award (1983)
Highly Commended - CBCA Children's Book of the Year Award: Older Readers (1983)
Honorary Diploma - International Board on Books for Young People (1983)
AWGIE Awards for Best Adaptation, Children's Television Drama (for the television mini-series) (1987)

See also

 List of Australian television series

References

External links

1982 novels
Australian children's novels
Novels set in Sydney
Nine Network original programming
Australian children's television series
Australian comedy television series
1982 children's books
Films scored by Chris Neal (songwriter)